= Bir Rumah =

- Bir Rumah بئر رومة (Arabic)
- Location of Bir Rumah in Medina, Saudi Arabia
- 24.4932593°N 39.5850716°E
- Location: Medina

Bir Rumah, also known as Bir Uthman, (Arabic: بئر رومة), also called Kalib Mazni, is a well located in the Al-Aqiq area northwest of the Prophet's Mosque in Medina, Saudi Arabia. Traditionally believed to have been purchased (or according to some traditions dug) by Uthman ibn Affan, who later served as the third Caliph of Islam.

== Name Origin ==
- Bir Rumah was named after a man from the Muzaynah tribe called Rumah, who owned it before Islam. It was considered one of the most famous water sources during the Prophet's era in Medina.
- It was called Bir Uthman because it became a charitable endowment for Muslims after Uthman ibn Affan purchased it and made its water freely available to the people.

== Importance ==
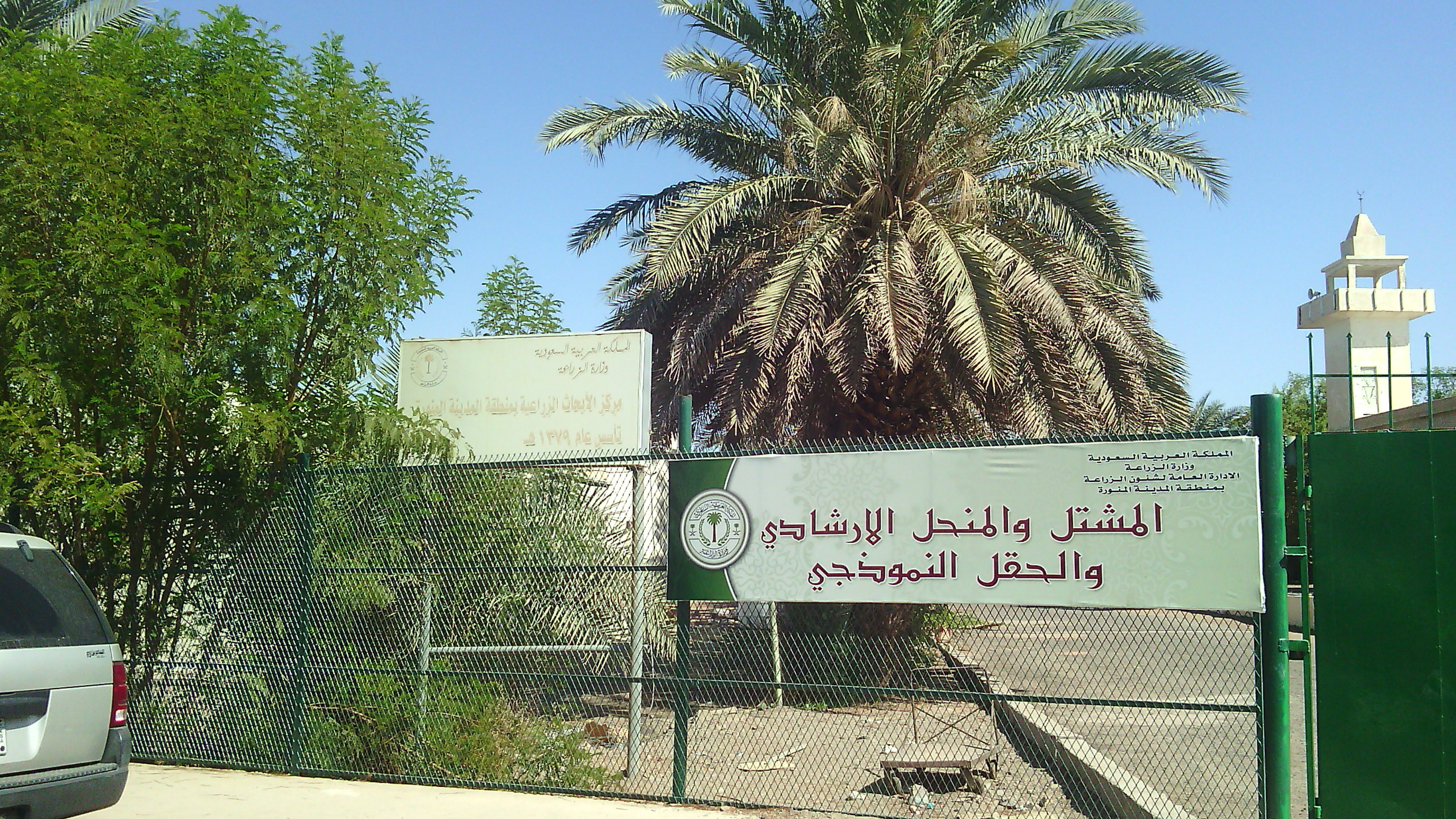
The Well of the Uthman Farm in Madinah

Importance of the well during the time of the prophet are:

- The well had sweet, fresh water, and it was privately owned; its water was sold to people for a price.
- Uthman bought it and made it a waqf (charitable endowment).
- It is considered one of the most significant endowments established by the Companions.
- Over the centuries its importance has been noted by a number of leading Muslim scholars.

== The Well Today ==
- It still exists, its location is known, and it is considered one of notable historical wells in Madinah.
- It is part of the endowments of Uthman ibn Affan that have remained through the centuries.

== See also ==
- Medina
- Sacred waters
